Românași is a commune located in Sălaj County, Crișana, Romania. It is composed of six villages: Chichișa (Alsónyárló), Ciumărna (Csömörlő), Păușa (Egregypósa), Poarta Sălajului (Vaskapu), Românași and Romita (Romlott).

Sights 
 Wooden church in Păușa (c.1738), historic monument
 Wooden church in Ciumărna (built in the 18th century), historic monument
 Wooden church in Chichișa (c.1739), historic monument
 Wooden church in Poarta Sălajului (built in the 17th century), historic monument
 Wooden church in Romita (built in the 18th century), historic monument
 Castra Certinae of Romita 
 Castra Largina of Românași

References

Communes in Sălaj County
Localities in Crișana